The alpine stream salamander (Batrachuperus tibetanus) is a species of salamander in the family Hynobiidae endemic to central China. Its natural habitats are rivers and freshwater springs. It is threatened by habitat loss.

It occurs in Sichuan, Shaanxi, Qinghai, Tibet, and Gansu provinces.

References

External links
 Batrachuperus tibetanus Encyclopedia of Life page

Batrachuperus
Taxonomy articles created by Polbot
Amphibians described in 1925